PSSA stands for Persatuan Sepakbola Seluruh Asahan (en: Football Association All Asahan). PSSA Asahan is an  Indonesian football club based in Kisaran, Asahan Regency, North Sumatra. They played in Liga 3. After the 2018 season finished, they were absent from the Liga 3 competition for three consecutive seasons. however in their youth team, they are currently competing in the Soeratin Cup.

PSSA stadium named Mutiara Kisaran Stadium. Its location was in downtown Kisaran, Asahan Regency, North Sumatra.

References

External links
PSSA Asahan at Liga-Indonesia.co.id

Football clubs in Indonesia
Football clubs in North Sumatra